Marcin Jałocha  (born 17 March 1971 in Kraków) is a Polish football manager and former professional player.

Playing career

National team
He represented his native country at the 1992 Summer Olympics in Barcelona. There he won the silver medal with the national squad.

Jałocha made 18 appearances for the Poland national football team, scoring one goal.

Coaching career
He was the manager of Resovia Rzeszów.

Career statistics

International goals
Scores and results list. Poland's goal tally first.

Personal life
His uncle Jan is a former football player and Polish international.

References

External links
 
 Profile at 90Minut.pl 
 

1971 births
Living people
Footballers from Kraków
Polish footballers
Poland international footballers
Wisła Kraków players
Legia Warsaw players
Polonia Warsaw players
Ceramika Opoczno players
Hutnik Nowa Huta players
Proszowianka Proszowice players
Bruk-Bet Termalica Nieciecza managers
Olympic footballers of Poland
Footballers at the 1992 Summer Olympics
Olympic silver medalists for Poland
Polish expatriate footballers
Expatriate footballers in Belgium
Polish expatriate sportspeople in Belgium
Olympic medalists in football
Medalists at the 1992 Summer Olympics
Association football defenders
Polish football managers
Radomiak Radom managers
Kmita Zabierzów managers
Sandecja Nowy Sącz managers
I liga managers
II liga managers